American Predator: The Hunt for the Most Meticulous Serial Killer of the 21st Century is a 2019 true crime nonfiction book about serial killer Israel Keyes, written by Maureen Callahan.

Critical reception
The book received highly positive reviews. The New York Journal of Books called American Predator "A gripping and chilling look into how a serial killer operates in plain sight and exactly what it takes to capture him, American Predator is a must-read for any true crime enthusiast."

References

2019 non-fiction books
Non-fiction crime books
English-language books
Viking Press books